"Time Waits for No One" is a song written by Neil Sedaka and Howard Greenfield, and originally recorded by Sedaka in 1970.

Friends of Distinction cover
The song was covered by The Friends of Distinction in 1970 on their Whatever LP. The group made "Time Waits for No One" into a hit in the United States (#60), Canada (#37) and New Zealand (#18).

Chart history

References

External links
 

1970 songs
1970 singles
The Friends of Distinction songs
Neil Sedaka songs
Songs written by Neil Sedaka
Songs with lyrics by Howard Greenfield
RCA Victor singles